Chandradimuka Stadium is a football stadium located in Dukuh, Kebumen, Kebumen Regency, Central Java, Indonesia. It is the home stadium of the Persak Kebumen football club which can hold around 10,000 spectators. The stadium is also used for local community activities, including concerts.

See also 
 List of stadiums in Indonesia

References 

Football venues in Indonesia
Multi-purpose stadiums in Indonesia
Buildings and structures in Kebumen Regency
Sports venues completed in 1992
1992 establishments in Indonesia
Persak Kebumen
Kebumen (town)